Kevin Michael Cosgrove (January 6, 1955 – September 11, 2001) was an American insurance senior business executive and victim of the September 11 attacks on the World Trade Center. He served as a vice president at Aon Corporation.

Cosgrove is known for the 9-1-1 call he made during his final moments, which ended with him screaming from inside the South Tower as it collapsed. The recording was used during the prosecution of Zacarias Moussaoui, the only criminal trial to result from the attacks. Cosgrove's last words made international headlines.

Personal life
Cosgrove and his family lived in West Islip, New York.

September 11 attacks
Cosgrove was a vice president of claims for Aon Corporation and a fire warden for the company. According to the 911 recording played during the trial of Zacarias Moussaoui, Cosgrove was located in the northwest corner of the 105th floor in the South Tower, overlooking the World Financial Center when he called 911 at 9:54 am.

In the recording, Cosgrove tells 911 dispatchers that he is calling from John Ostaru's office and that he has two other individuals with him. One he mentions by name: Doug Cherry. Cosgrove tells the operator: "My wife thinks I'm all right; I called and said I was leaving the building and that I was fine, and then bang!" A 911 operator later calls him; he answers: "Hello. We're looking in [...] we're overlooking the Financial Center. Three of us. Two broken windows." A rumbling sound is then heard as the building starts to collapse. Cosgrove is heard to scream "Oh, God! Oh—!" in fear. His call immediately cuts off and ends as the South Tower collapses at 9:59 am.

Aftermath and legacy

Cosgrove's remains were found in the rubble. He was buried on September 22, 2001, at St. Patrick Catholic Cemetery in Huntington, New York. He was 46 years old. He was survived by his wife, Wendy Cosgrove, a schoolteacher, and his three children.

Wendy Cosgrove testified during the punishment phase of Moussaoui's trial, in which prosecutors sought the death penalty for Moussaoui. Wendy Cosgrove testified about her husband's last moments when he was trapped on the South Tower's 105th floor, and jurors heard an audio tape of Cosgrove's 9-1-1 phone call in which he told a dispatcher: "We're not ready to die." Wendy Cosgrove also testified that their oldest son, who was 12 on the day of the attacks, suffered a decline in his academic performance and had developed anger and self-destructive habits as well as trouble with the law, while their middle child, who was 9 at the time of the attacks, exhibited self-mutilation for which she has undergone therapy.

At the National 9/11 Memorial, Cosgrove is memorialized at the South Pool on Panel S-60.

See also
 Edna Cintron
 Melissa Doi
 Frank De Martini

References

External links

 

1955 births
2001 deaths
Victims of the September 11 attacks
Businesspeople from New York (state)
Businesspeople in insurance
American Roman Catholics
People murdered in New York City
Male murder victims
Terrorism deaths in New York (state)
American terrorism victims
People from West Islip, New York
20th-century American businesspeople